Antonenko or Antonenka (Ukrainian or Russian: Антоненко, Belarusian: Антоненка) is a gender-neutral Ukrainian surname that may refer to
Aleksandr Antonenko (born 1975), Latvian singer
Borys Antonenko-Davydovych (1899–1984), Ukrainian writer, translator and linguist
Irina Antonenko (born 1991), Russian actress and model 
Oksana Antonenko,  Russian economist
Oleg Antonenko (born 1971), Belarusian ice hockey player

See also
 

Ukrainian-language surnames
Patronymic surnames
Surnames from given names